Mauricio Ernesto González Barillas (May 13, 1942 – 15 December 2018) was a football player from El Salvador who played as a midfielder.

Club career
González played the majority of his career for Atlético Marte, with whom he won one league title. He also had a spell abroad with Guatemalan side Xelajú MC.

International career
Nicknamed Pachín, he represented his country at the 1968 Summer Olympics. González also participated at the 1963 CONCACAF Championship and the 1965 CONCACAF Championship where he scored a total of 5 goals in 10 matches.

Personal life
Mauricio was the eldest brother of Salvadoran football legend Jorge Mágico González and son of Óscar Ernesto González and Victoria Barillas. He was married to Fermina and they had 5 children.

Death
Gonzales died from natural causes on the 15th of December 2018.

Honours
Primera División de Fútbol de El Salvador: 2
 1968, 1975

 Copa de Guatemala: 1
 1973

References

1942 births
2018 deaths
Sportspeople from San Salvador
Association football midfielders
Salvadoran footballers
El Salvador international footballers
Olympic footballers of El Salvador
Footballers at the 1968 Summer Olympics
C.D. Atlético Marte footballers
Alianza F.C. footballers
Xelajú MC players
Salvadoran expatriate footballers
Expatriate footballers in Guatemala
Salvadoran expatriate sportspeople in Guatemala
Salvadoran football managers